Arvo Kyllönen (17 December 1932 – 10 June 2017) was a Finnish wrestler who won national titles in the 57 kg freestyle (1952) and 62 kg Greco-Roman divisions (1954). He competed in Greco-Roman bantamweight at the 1952 Summer Olympics, but was eliminated in the third round. Kyllönen was a firefighter by profession. After retiring from competitions he also coached young wrestlers.

References

External links
 

1932 births
2017 deaths
Olympic wrestlers of Finland
Wrestlers at the 1952 Summer Olympics
Finnish male sport wrestlers
Finnish wrestling coaches
People from Imatra
Sportspeople from South Karelia
20th-century Finnish people
21st-century Finnish people